Misfit Studios Publishing is a Canadian small press business located in Toronto, Ontario, Canada. Founded in 2003 by Steven Trustrum, the company publishes a number of role-playing game products under limited and open license terms.

History 
Misfit Studios Publishing's founder says he began the company "after not being paid for his freelance writing one too many times." According to popular online role-playing game retailer, RPGNow, Misfit Studios' first published product was the Barbarian Hawkeye, in January 2005.

According to its own online store, the company has since published over 150 role-playing game-related products of various sizes and prices.

Christina Stiles worked as a freelancer with Eden Studios beginning in 2002 on a project called Odyssey Prime for her company, Bizarro Games; the game took years to complete, and by the time it was finally released four years later, Bizarro Games had merged into Misfit Studios, which released Odyssey Prime only in PDF and POD. Eden Studios also released Enemies Archived (2006), a book of enemy encounters for Armageddon produced in PDF and POD in conjunction with Misfit Studios. Misfit Studios supported the Spirosblaak (2005) setting from Green Ronin Publishing's Mythic Vistas series.

Products and licenses

References

2003 establishments in Ontario
Mass media companies established in 2003
Organizations based in Toronto
Publishing companies of Canada
Role-playing game publishing companies